The geographic areas of Sugar Land, Texas are home to many master-planned communities featuring golf courses, country clubs, and lakes.

Planning
The city has the most master-planned communities in Fort Bend County, which is home to the largest number of master-planned communities in the nation. The first master-planned community to be developed in Sugar Land was Sugar Creek, a  community consisting mainly of luxury homes on the city's east side. There are now a total of thirteen master-planned communities located in Sugar Land's city limits and its extraterritorial jurisdiction combined.

Districts and communities

Northern Sugar Land
The northern portion of Sugar Land, sometimes referred to by residents and government officials as "north Sugar Land", comprises all the communities north of U.S. Highway 90A, such as Mayfield Park and Ragus Lake Estates. It also includes the subdivisions of Venetian Estates, Sugar Mill and Belknap/Brookside, which are just south of U.S. Highway 90A. Most of this area included the original city limits of Sugar Land when it was incorporated in 1959. Most outsiders are only aware about this part of the city when they think of Sugar Land.

Located on the north side of U.S. Highway 90A is the former Imperial Sugar Company refinery and distribution center that was shut down in 2003. However, Imperial Sugar's headquarters are still located within the city just across the street from the old refinery. This part of the city has two master-planned communities, Sugar Mill and the recent development of Woodbridge, located outside of the city limits. Another recent mid-size residential development is the Glen Laurel community. On the east side of north Sugar Land is the Sugar Land Business Park, which is home to many of the city's electronic and energy companies. Sugar Land Business Park is the largest business and industrial area in the city.

The majority of the pupils attending high school in this area are zoned to Kempner High School. The north side of Sugar Land is also home to the Fort Bend Christian Academy.

Southern and southeastern Sugar Land
Most of the population within the city limits is concentrated in the southern and southeastern areas of Sugar Land. This area is entirely master-planned communities, including an overwhelming majority of residents of First Colony, the largest in Sugar Land encompassing 10,000 acres (40 km2). All areas of First Colony located east of Dulles Avenue are located in nearby Missouri City. Other master-planned communities in this area include Sugar Creek (except for a small portion located in Stafford, Sugar Lakes, Commonwealth, Avalon, Brazos Landing, and Riverstone.

The vast majority of Sugar Land's major economic and entertainment activities are concentrated in these areas of Sugar Land. This area is the location of First Colony Mall, Sugar Land Town Square (which is home to the new Sugar Land City Hall), and other major commercial areas.

This area boasts a wide range of recreational activities including three golf courses and country clubs. Two of them, Riverbend Country Club (18 holes) and Sugar Creek Country Club (27 holes), are situated around the Sugar Creek development, which combine for a total of 45 holes of golf. The third, Sweetwater Country Club, is situated in the Sweetwater area of First Colony and was once the home of the LPGA. Another prominent recreational facility is the Sugar Land Ice & Sports Center (formerly the Sugar Land Aerodrome), which is the home of the practice facility for the Houston Aeros of the AHL, the premier minor hockey league in the United States.

Further southeast, but north of the Brazos River, is the new Riverstone master-planned community development of 2,800 acres (11 km2) with approximately 2,300 in Sugar Land's jurisdiction. This new community is immediately to the east of the Commonwealth and First Colony developments. There is plan for a golf course and country club located within Sugar Land's jurisdiction. The community also features many parks and man-made lakes.

High school students in these areas of Sugar Land are divided among four high schools:
 Clements High School, zoned to areas of First Colony south of Highway 6, as well as Avalon and Brazos Landing.
 Dulles High School, which takes in all areas of First Colony north of Highway 6, and Sugar Creek.
 Elkins High School, whose students come from the far southeastern fringes of the First Colony development as well as Riverstone.
 Kempner High School, which takes in the Sugar Lakes community.

Southwestern Sugar Land
Sugar Land's southwestern areas are actually situated in the extraterritorial jurisdiction of the city. This area is sometimes referred to as the "other side of the river" by locals because it is separated from the rest of Sugar Land's ETJ and the city itself by the Brazos River. Its culture and activities are different from other parts of Sugar Land's ETJ and the city itself as well due to a separation by the Brazos River. All of this area is in the Lamar Consolidated Independent School District and zoned to Lamar Consolidated High School.

This area has two master-planned communities, Greatwood and River Park. Greatwood is 2,050 acre (8 km2) located south of U.S. Highway 59 with a public golf course surrounding the community and is almost at built-out. River Park, a 790-acre (3.2 km2) development, almost built out as well, is located north of U.S. with State Highway 99 traversing through the community.

Other communities in this area are Canyon Gate on the Brazos, which is still in development, and Tara Colony, an older large subdivision which has a Richmond address but is actually in the extraterritorial jurisdiction of Sugar Land and is up for future annexation.

Western Sugar Land
The western portion of Sugar Land is partially in the city limits and partially in the extraterritorial jurisdiction. This area is west of Ditch "H", just west of State Highway 6 and north of the Brazos River. It is home to the 2,200 acre (8.9 km2) master-planned community of New Territory and the upcoming 2,018 acre (8.2 km2) development, Telfair. New Territory was built out in 2003 and Telfair began building homes in early 2006.

All of the land of what is now the upcoming Telfair community was once a prison farm land owned by the Texas Department of Transportation. It was sold in 2003 and annexed to the city limits by Sugar Land in 2004. A new highway, State Highway 99, opened in 1994 is a major arterial in this area. North of U.S. Highway 90A, which borders the city's west side, is the Sugar Land Regional Airport and the Texas Department of Criminal Justice Central Unit.

Geography of Fort Bend County, Texas